Mihai Răzvan Ungureanu (born 22 September 1968) is a Romanian historian, politician and former Prime Minister of Romania. He was the foreign minister of Romania from 28 December 2004 to 12 March 2007, and he was appointed as Director of the Foreign Intelligence Service later in 2007. Following the resignation of the Emil Boc government  he was appointed Prime Minister serving through April 2012 when his cabinet was dismissed following a parliamentary vote of no-confidence. He was confirmed by the Parliament for a second term as Director of the Foreign Intelligence Service, after President Klaus Iohannis nominated him in June 2015 but he resigned in September 2016, citing health issues.

Personal life
Mihai Răzvan Ungureanu is married and has one son. He is fluent in three foreign languages (English, French, and German) and he also reads Hungarian.

Education
Ungureanu studied Maths and Physics at the Costache Negruzzi High School in Iași, where he graduated valedictorian in 1987. Ungureanu later studied History and Philosophy at the Alexandru Ioan Cuza University where he graduated in 1992. From 1985 to 1989, Ungureanu was an alternate member of the Union of Communist Youth Central Committee, while between 1990 and 1992 he was a member of the university senate as a student representative. In 1993, Ungureanu obtained a master's degree at the Oxford Centre for Hebrew and Jewish Studies, an affiliated programme of St Cross College at the University of Oxford. In March 2004 he received a PhD degree from the Alexandru Ioan Cuza University after submitting a thesis on the "Conversion and integration in the Romanian society in the early-modern era".

Professional career

Ungureanu was an assistant professor at the Alexandru Ioan Cuza University when he was recruited to the diplomatic service in 1998. He subsequently served as State Secretary in the Ministry of Foreign Affairs (1998–2000), and was a Vienna-based representative of the Stability Pact for South Eastern Europe (2000–2004).

A member of the National Liberal Party (PNL), part of the Justice and Truth Alliance (DA), Ungureanu became foreign minister after the candidate supported by the alliance, Traian Băsescu, won the presidential election. On February 2, 2007, Prime Minister Călin Popescu-Tăriceanu requested Ungureanu's resignation because Ungureanu had failed to inform the government about the detention of two Romanian workers by coalition forces in Iraq. On February 4, Ungureanu confirmed his resignation, Popescu-Tăriceanu said that Ungureanu would continue to act as foreign minister until the swearing in of a successor. On March 12, President Traian Băsescu signed a decree removing Ungureanu from his position.

Foreign Information Service tenure
On November 27, 2007, Băsescu nominated Ungureanu to head the Foreign Information Service (SIE), the directorship of which had been vacant since Claudiu Săftoiu's March 19 resignation, related to the same scandal in Iraq. A joint session of Parliament confirmed Ungureanu in his new position on December 5, with 295 of 318 MPs present voting in favour.

Prime Minister
On February 6, 2012, Ungureanu was given a mandate by President Traian Băsescu to form a new government, which  the Romanian parliament approved on February 9, 2012. Ungureanu vowed to continue reforms and promote Romania's economic and political stability amid the country's political crisis. As Prime Minister, Ungureanu had become the Democratic Liberal Party's probable candidate for the presidency when Băsescu's term expired in 2014, senior party members said, a move echoing Russia's President Boris Yeltsin's choice and promotion of Vladimir Putin. After two and a half months, Ungureanu's cabinet failed to pass a no-confidence vote introduced by the Social Liberal Union. Opposition leader Victor Ponta on 7 May 2012 replaced him as prime minister.

After Prime Ministership

The political activity of Ungureanu after the premiership was intensive. In July 2012, he founded the non-governmental organization of Center-Right Civic Initiative (ICCD), together with PDL leaders Cristian Preda and Monica Macovei. He spoke about a political and electoral forces, without PNL. The alliance was founded in late August 2012 and include Democratic Liberal Party (PDL), Christian Democratic National Peasants' Party (PNȚCD), New Republic Party and Center-Right Civic Initiative. On 31 August, Ungureanu joined Civic Force (FC).

Civic Force leadership

Ungureanu was elected the Head of the party during The Civic Force party congress in September 2012. Civic Force Party (PFC) became the "electoral vehicle" of ICCD and replaced the ONG in Right Romania Alliance (ARD) membership. After the election, Ungureanu started a European tournee for the accession of PFC to European People's Party (EPP). On 11 September, he met with the Italian deputy and member of The People of Freedom (PdL), Claudio Scajola, the Mayor of Rome and Giovanni Battista Re, secretary of Holy See. They welcomed the formation of "an alliance of right in the opposition of left attacks".

Ungureanu reorganized the party, founding new branches of the PFC around the country. He has held discussions with the former Italian Prime Minister, Silvio Berlusconi, the President of EPP, Wilfried Martens, the Secretary-General of PdL, Angelino Alfano, the Secretary-General of Union for a Popular Movement, Jean-François Copé, and the leader of EPP europarliamentary group, Joseph Daul on the accession of Civic Force at EPP. According to him, the accession folder of the party was accepted and FC started the accession process.

Ungureanu won a seat in the Senate on ARD's party list in the 2012 elections.

See also 
 Ungureanu cabinet

References

External links
 Mihai-Razvan Ungureanu: "Viata mea este o inlantuire de intalniri fericite
 Cum au ÎNSTRĂINAT Traian Băsescu și Mihai Răzvan Ungureanu TEZAURUL României rușilor
 Rusia a vrut să returneze tezaurul României, însă România a refuzat. Cine va plăti pentru asta?

|-

|-

|-

|- 

1968 births
Costache Negruzzi National College alumni
Alexandru Ioan Cuza University alumni
Academic staff of Alexandru Ioan Cuza University
Alumni of St Cross College, Oxford
Directors of the Foreign Intelligence Service (Romania)
Living people
National Liberal Party (Romania) politicians
Politicians from Iași
Prime Ministers of Romania
Romanian Ministers of Foreign Affairs
Diplomats from Iași